In enzymology, a demethylsterigmatocystin 6-O-methyltransferase is an enzyme that catalyzes the chemical reaction

S-adenosyl-L-methionine + 6-demethylsterigmatocystin  S-adenosyl-L-homocysteine + sterigmatocystin

Thus, the two substrates of this enzyme are S-adenosyl methionine and 6-demethylsterigmatocystin, whereas its two products are S-adenosylhomocysteine and sterigmatocystin.

This enzyme belongs to the family of transferases, specifically those transferring one-carbon group methyltransferases.  The systematic name of this enzyme class is S-adenosyl-L-methionine:6-demethylsterigmatocystin 6-O-methyltransferase. Other names in common use include demethylsterigmatocystin methyltransferase, and O-methyltransferase I.

References

 

EC 2.1.1
Enzymes of unknown structure